Ewan MacDonald (born 17 November 1975 in Inverness, Scotland) is a Scottish curler. Representing Scotland, he is a three-time World Champion, playing second for Hammy McMillan in 1999 and playing third for David Murdoch in 2006 and 2009. He has also represented Great Britain at three Winter Olympics, in Salt Lake City 2002, Torino 2006 and Vancouver 2010.

Career
At his World Championship debut in 1999, MacDonald played second for Hammy McMillan. Their Scottish team would go all the way and win the gold medal defeating Canada in the final, skipped by Jeff Stoughton. Later that year they won the European Curling Championships defeating Denmark in the final skipped by Ulrik Schmidt.

In 2001 the team was back at the European Championships, but they finished in fifth place. In 2002 they represented Great Britain at the 2002 Winter Olympics and finished in seventh place. That year Ewan switched teams to play second for Warwick Smith. They went to the 2002 Ford World Curling Championships and won a bronze medal. The team returned to the 2003 Ford World Curling Championships and finished in seventh place. At the 2004 Ford World Curling Championships, MacDonald skipped Scotland to a fifth-place finish.

At the 2005 Ford World Men's Curling Championship, MacDonald was an alternate for David Murdoch's silver medal-winning team. Later that year, MacDonald moved up to play second and the team won a bronze at the European Championships. By 2006, MacDonald was playing third and the new team finished in fourth place at the 2006 Winter Olympics. They would also go to the 2006 World Men's Curling Championship where they won a gold medal.

Ewan MacDonald would return to the World Championship podium at the 2009 Moncton World Championships where his team won the gold medal. For the round robin portion of the competition MacDonald had the best percentage, 88%, of all Thirds. In the 1 vs. 2 Playoff Match and in the Gold Medal Match he outshot Canadian third John Morris shooting 89% and 88% respectively.

Teammates 
2010 Vancouver Olympic Games
David Murdoch, Skip
Peter Smith, Second
Euan Byers, Lead
Graeme Connal, Alternate
2006 Torino Olympic Games
David Murdoch, Skip
Warwick Smith, Second
Euan Byers, Lead
Craig Wilson, Alternate
2002 Salt Lake City Olympic Games
Hammy McMillan, Skip
Warwick Smith, Third
Peter Loudon, Lead
Norman Brown, Alternate

References

External links
 

1975 births
Living people
Scottish male curlers
British male curlers
Olympic curlers of Great Britain
Curlers at the 2002 Winter Olympics
Curlers at the 2006 Winter Olympics
Curlers at the 2010 Winter Olympics
World curling champions
European curling champions
Continental Cup of Curling participants
Sportspeople from Inverness